The J. M. Burk House is a historic house in Geneva, Nebraska. It was built in 1891 for J. M. Burk, a hardware store owner, and designed in Queen Anne style (one aspect of which being its irregular massing). In 1916, it was acquired by Walferd C. Peterson who lived here with his wife Rosalie and their nine children. The house has been listed on the National Register of Historic Places since February 23, 2001.

References

		
National Register of Historic Places in Fillmore County, Nebraska
Queen Anne architecture in Nebraska
Houses completed in 1891
1891 establishments in Nebraska